Sulejman Pitarka (1924–2007) was an Albanian actor, writer, and playwright originally from Debar. His family moved to Durrës, Albania, when he was five. His brother was Bashkim Pitarka, who became an Albanian diplomat. 

He was active in films and in the National Theater of Albania in Tirana. He was awarded the People's Artist of Albania.

Filmography 
Loin des barbares - (1994)
Vdekja e burrit - (1991)
Historiani dhe kameleoni - (1989)
Nata e parë e lirisë - (1984)
Në prag të lirisë - (1981)
Shtëpia jonë e përbashkët - (1981)
Goditja (1980)
Ballë për ballë - (1979)
Gjeneral gramafoni - (1978)
Pas gjurmëve - (1978)
Gunat mbi tela - (1977)
Tinguj lufte - (1976)
Horizonte të hapura - (1968)
Debatik - (1961)
 The Great Warrior Skanderbeg - (1953)
   Nxenesit e klases sime  - (1984)

References

Albanian male film actors
1924 births
2007 deaths
People's Artists of Albania
People from Debar